Taroa is an island in the east of Maloelap Atoll in the Marshall Islands. During World War II, it was the site of a major Japanese airfield (Taroa Airfield). The airfield was destroyed towards the end of World War II, and wreckage and remnants of the base can still be seen around the island.

The island was not resettled by the Marshallese until the 1970s, but is now the atoll's main economic center due to the re-opened airstrip and local copra production.

References

Maloelap Atoll
Islands of the Marshall Islands